This is a partial list of actors who have played the role of a real or fictitious president of the Philippines in films, television, and other media.

This list excludes:
Other historical figures has been considered by historians as an unofficial president of the Philippines and was similarly portrayed in fiction as such like the depiction of Andres Bonifacio by Robin Padilla in the 2014 film Bonifacio: Ang Unang Pangulo.
Depiction of a president of the Philippines that covered a period outside their presidencies; e.g. Iginuhit ng Tadhana a 1965 biographical film of Ferdinand Marcos prior to his being elected President.

Portrayal of real presidents

Film and Television

Portrayal of fictional presidents
Film

Television

References

president of the Philippines
Actors who played
Cultural depictions of politicians
president